Diploschema mandibulare is a species of beetle in the family Cerambycidae. It was described by Ernst Fuchs in 1964.

References

Torneutini
Beetles described in 1964